Eurycnema is a genus of stick insects in the family Phasmatidae and tribe Phasmatini.  Species have a known distribution from Australasia and Southeast Asia.

Species 
Eurycnema includes the following species:
 Eurycnema goliath (Gray, 1834)
 Eurycnema nigrospinosa Redtenbacher, 1908
 Eurycnema osiris (Gray, 1834) 
 Eurycnema versirubra (Audinet-Serville, 1838) - type species (as Cyphocrania versirubra Audinet-Serville, by subsequent designation)

References

External Links

Phasmatodea genera
Phasmatidae
Phasmatodea of Asia